The 2011 Florida Atlantic Owls football team represented Florida Atlantic University in the 2011 NCAA Division I FBS football season. The Owls' head coach, Howard Schnellenberger, was in his 11th and final season at the school, as he announced his retirement before the start of the season. The team played its home games at the brand new FAU Stadium. They are members of the Sun Belt Conference. They finished the season 1–11, 0–8 in Sun Belt play to finish in last place.

Schedule

Roster

References

Florida Atlantic
Florida Atlantic Owls football seasons
Florida Atlantic Owls football